Riptortus is a genus of broad-headed bugs in the family Alydidae. There are more than 20 described species in Riptortus.

Species
These 27 species belong to the genus Riptortus:

 Riptortus abdominalis (Westwood, 1842)
 Riptortus acantharis (Dallas, 1852)
 Riptortus aegyptiacus Lindberg, 1939
 Riptortus annulicornis (Guérin-Méneville, 1831)
 Riptortus decisus (Walker, 1871)
 Riptortus dentipes (Fabricius, 1787)
 Riptortus distinguendus Blöte, 1934
 Riptortus eugeniae (Stål, 1859)
 Riptortus fabricii (Signoret, 1861)
 Riptortus flavovittatus (Stål, 1855)
 Riptortus fuliginosus Blöte & Hagenbach, 1934
 Riptortus imperialis Kirkaldy, 1905
 Riptortus insularis China, 1930
 Riptortus linearis (Fabricius, 1775)
 Riptortus longipes (Dallas, 1852)
 Riptortus macleani Schaffner, 1963
 Riptortus masculus Breddin, 1901
 Riptortus oxianus Kiritshenko, 1914
 Riptortus parvus Hsiao, 1964
 Riptortus pedestris (Fabricius, 1775) (Bean Bug)
 Riptortus pilosus (Thunberg, 1783)
 Riptortus rubronotatus Blöte, 1934
 Riptortus ryukyuensis Kikuhara, 2005
 Riptortus saileri Usinger, 1952
 Riptortus serripes (Fabricius, 1775)
 Riptortus stalii (Signoret, 1858)
 Riptortus strenuus Horváth, 1889

References

Further reading

External links

 

Alydidae
Pentatomomorpha genera